Michael J. George (September 28, 1946 – June 8, 2010) was an American politician and businessman.

George was born in Saint Paul, Minnesota and went to Central High School in Saint Paul. He went to University of Minnesota from 1964 to 1968. George lived in Mahtomedi, Minnesota with his wife and family. George was involved with the Canvas Products Association. George served on the Minnesota Real Estate Advisory Council. He served in the Minnesota House of Representatives from 1975 to1978 and was a Democrat.

References

1946 births
2010 deaths
Businesspeople from Saint Paul, Minnesota
Politicians from Saint Paul, Minnesota
People from Mahtomedi, Minnesota
University of Minnesota alumni
Democratic Party members of the Minnesota House of Representatives